The 2021 Everest Canadian Senior Curling Championships was held from December 6 to 11 at the Community First Curling Centre in Sault Ste. Marie, Ontario.

Men

Teams
The teams are listed as follows:

Round-robin standings
Final round-robin standings

Round-robin results

All draws are listed in Eastern Time (UTC−05:00).

Draw 1
Monday, December 6, 8:30 am

Draw 2
Monday, December 6, 12:00 pm

Draw 3
Monday, December 6, 4:00 pm

Draw 4
Monday, December 6, 8:30 pm

Draw 5
Tuesday, December 7, 8:30 am

Draw 6
Tuesday, December 7, 12:00 pm

Draw 7
Tuesday, December 7, 4:00 pm

Draw 8
Tuesday, December 7, 8:00 pm

Draw 9
Wednesday, December 8, 8:30 am

Draw 10
Wednesday, December 8, 12:00 pm

Draw 11
Wednesday, December 8, 4:00 pm

Draw 12
Wednesday, December 8, 8:00 pm

Placement round

Seeding pool

Standings
Final Seeding Pool Standings

Results

Draw 13
Thursday, December 9, 8:30 am

Draw 15
Thursday, December 9, 3:30 pm

Draw 17
Friday, December 10, 10:00 am

Championship pool

Standings
Final Championship Pool Standings

Results

Draw 14
Thursday, December 9, 12:00 pm

Draw 16
Thursday, December 9, 7:00 pm

Draw 18
Friday, December 10, 2:00 pm

Draw 19
Friday, December 10, 7:00 pm

Playoffs

Semifinals
Saturday, December 11, 10:30 am

Bronze medal game
Saturday, December 11, 3:30 pm

Gold medal game
Saturday, December 11, 3:30 pm

Women

Teams
The teams are listed as follows:

Round-robin standings
Final round-robin standings

Round-robin results

All draws are listed in Eastern Time (UTC−05:00).

Draw 1
Monday, December 6, 8:30 am

Draw 2
Monday, December 6, 12:00 pm

Draw 3
Monday, December 6, 4:00 pm

Draw 4
Monday, December 6, 8:30 pm

Draw 5
Tuesday, December 7, 8:30 am

Draw 6
Tuesday, December 7, 12:00 pm

Draw 7
Tuesday, December 7, 4:00 pm

Draw 8
Tuesday, December 7, 8:00 pm

Draw 9
Wednesday, December 8, 8:30 am

Draw 10
Wednesday, December 8, 12:00 pm

Draw 11
Wednesday, December 8, 4:00 pm

Draw 12
Wednesday, December 8, 8:00 pm

Placement round

Seeding pool

Standings
Final Seeding Pool Standings

Results

Draw 13
Thursday, December 9, 8:30 am

Draw 15
Thursday, December 9, 3:30 pm

Draw 17
Friday, December 10, 10:00 am

Championship pool

Standings
Final Championship Pool Standings

Results

Draw 14
Thursday, December 9, 12:00 pm

Draw 16
Thursday, December 9, 7:00 pm

Draw 18
Friday, December 10, 2:00 pm

Draw 19
Friday, December 10, 7:00 pm

Playoffs

Semifinals
Saturday, December 11, 10:30 am

Bronze medal game
Saturday, December 11, 3:30 pm

Gold medal game
Saturday, December 11, 3:30 pm

References

External links

2021 in Canadian curling
2021 in Ontario
December 2021 sports events in Canada
Sport in Sault Ste. Marie, Ontario
Curling in Northern Ontario
Canadian Senior Curling Championships